GhostDeini The Great is a compilation album by American rapper Ghostface Killah. It was released on December 16, 2008. The album includes singles as well as new and remixed tracks like "Be Easy (Remix)" featuring Ice Cube and "Kilo (Remix)" featuring Raekwon and Malice. Some versions also contain a DVD.

Track listing

References

2008 compilation albums
Albums produced by Pete Rock
Albums produced by RZA
Albums produced by Just Blaze
Def Jam Recordings compilation albums